Farnborough is a town in northeast Hampshire, England, part of the borough of Rushmoor and the Farnborough/Aldershot Built-up Area. Farnborough was founded in Saxon times and is mentioned in the Domesday Book of 1086. The name is formed from Ferneberga which means "fern hill". According to the UK-wide 2011 Census, the population of Farnborough is 57,486.

The town is probably best known for its association with aviation, with the Farnborough Airshow, Farnborough Airport, Royal Aircraft Establishment, and the Air Accidents Investigation Branch.

History
Farnborough is mentioned in the Domesday Book as part of the settlement of Crondall. Over the centuries, it was known as Ferneberga (11th century); Farnburghe, Farenberg (13th century); Farnborowe, Fremborough, and Farneborough (16th century).

Tower Hill
Tower Hill, Cove: There is substantial evidence
that many years ago a large accumulation of Sarsen stones existed upon what later came to be known as Tower Hill.

Farnborough Hill school
The town is the home of St. Michael's Abbey. The Imperial Crypt there is the resting place of Napoleon III (1808–1873), Emperor of the French, and his wife, Eugénie de Montijo, (1826–1920) and their son, Napoléon, Prince Imperial. The Abbey was the home of the Catholic National Library from 2007 until it was relocated to Durham University Library in 2015.

River Blackwater
The River Blackwater on the Hampshire/Surrey border was the location of the first international prize fight between Tom Sayers and John C. Heenan, which took place near the location of the Ship Inn pub.

Samuel Cody
Closely associated with Farnborough Airfield, situated between Farnborough and Fleet, is Samuel Franklin Cody. Cody, or Colonel Sam Cody as he was known, was one of the early pioneers of aviation. He died when he crashed his plane on Ball Hill, a site which is now within Qinetiq's Technology Park. A statue was unveiled on the 100th anniversary of his death, 7 August 2013. The statue is sited outside the FAST museum, home of the Farnborough Air Sciences Trust, surrounded by commemorative paving paid for by supporters.

RAE

Farnborough Airfield is the site of the historic Royal Aircraft Establishment (RAE). Part of the old RAE, Farnborough's historic wind tunnels are now listed buildings, two in particular being preserved, the first built in 1917 and the other, much larger, in 1935. The latter was used extensively for research into Concorde's aerodynamics, and later that of Formula 1 cars, until its closure in the early 1990s. The tunnels were open to the public during June and July 2014 until the end of the Farnborough International Airshow.

Sir Frank Whittle conducted much of his research into jet aircraft at the RAE.
A replica Gloster E.28/39 (based on his prototype) is sited on a roundabout along Ively Road in tribute to its inventor.

The Tumble Down Dick

An inn, The Tumble Down Dick Pub has been present on the A325 Farnborough Road since the 17th century. It was reputedly connected to Richard Cromwell, and was the central focus of the town before its 19th-century refocus toward North Camp and the town centre proper's 20th-century development. The pub closed in 2008 and was designated an "Asset of Community Value" in 2013 after local protest over a request for planning permission by McDonald's. The ACV status was later rescinded after an appeal by the site's owners. It was converted to a McDonald's restaurant and the building reopened with a new roof in October 2014 after being allowed to lie derelict for six years. During the renovation, an early advertisement for the H & G Simonds Brewery in Reading was discovered and is now on display on the side of the building.

Churches
St Peter's parish church dates back to 1180, as part of the manor of Crondall. It has a burial vault built by Henry Wilmot, Lord of the Manor from 1768. As Farnborough developed in the Victorian era, the church was extended to accommodate a growing congregation: a new chancel was built in 1886 and in 1900-01 north and south transepts and a south aisle were added.

St Mark's Anglican Church, Alexandra Road, was built in 1881.

Transport
Farnborough is near junctions 4 and 4a of the M3 motorway. The A325 enters the town from Frimley to the north, and continues into Aldershot to the south. The A331 runs north to south along the east side of the town.

Farnborough is served by three railway stations, the busiest of which is Farnborough (Main) railway station on the South West Main Line from London Waterloo to Basingstoke and beyond. Farnborough North railway station and North Camp railway station are both on the North Downs Line between Reading and Gatwick. North Camp station is a short distance over the county border, in the Surrey village of Ash Vale.

Since 2003 Farnborough Airport has been a business airport. It was operated by TAG Aviation until being acquired by  Macquarie Infrastructure and Real Assets in 2019. The Farnborough International Airshow takes place at the airport on even numbered years.

Governance

Borough
Farnborough is part of the Borough of Rushmoor, along with Aldershot.
It contains eight wards, each with three elected borough councillors. Until 2011, there were nine wards, but following the Electoral boundary reviews, Grange and Mayfield wards were merged to create Cherrywood ward. The full list of wards and their councillors is as follows:

Cove & Southwood:
Sue Carter (Conservative),
Steve Masterson (Conservative),
Martin Tennant (Conservative)

Cherrywood:
Nem Thapa (Conservative),
Christine Guinness (Labour),
Ashley Halstead (Labour)

Empress:
Marina Munro (Conservative),
Adrian Newell (Conservative),
Mike Smith (Conservative)

Fernhill:
John Marsh (Conservative),
Ken Muschamp (Conservative),
Jess Auton (Conservative)

Knellwood:
Mara Makunura (Conservative),
Calum Stewart (Conservative),
Paul Taylor (Conservative)

St. Johns:
Jacqui Vosper (Conservative),
Barbara Hurst (Conservative),
Jonathan Canty (Conservative)

St. Marks:
Dianne Bedford (Conservative),
Abul Chowdhury (Conservative was Liberal Democrats),
Thomas Mitchell (Liberal Democrats)

West Heath:
Rod Cooper (Conservative),
Lee Jeffers (Conservative),
Michael Hope (Conservative)

County
Farnborough is represented on Hampshire County Council by three Divisions, each with a single elected representative.

Farnborough North:
Roz Chadd (Conservative)

Farnborough South:
Adam Jackman (Conservative)

Farnborough West:
Rod Cooper (Conservative)

National
Since 2017, the local MP is Leo Docherty (Conservative) for the Constituency of Aldershot, a former captain in the army.

Notable residents
 French emperor Napoleon III, his wife Empress Eugenie and son Louis Napoleon are entombed in the crypt at Saint Michael's Abbey, although it was only Eugenie who was a resident of Farnborough while alive. Their former house was turned into an independent Boarding school and convent set in 64 acres of ground, Farnborough Hill Convent
 Anne Robinson went to school in Farnborough.
 Former Middlesex County Cricket Club captain Shaun Udal, who also played for Hampshire and at international level for England, was born and raised here.
 Arthur English lived in Farnborough for a period, as well as Christopher Lillicrap, children's TV presenter and writer. 
 Fernand Cabrol, monk and scholar became Prior and, later, Abbot at the Benedictine abbey.
 In 1922 T.E. Lawrence (Lawrence of Arabia) was posted to RAF Farnborough for a photography course, it is thought he lived in Farnborough for 6 weeks.
 Actress Janet Wright was born in Farnborough before moving to Canada as a child.
Robbe De Hert, Belgian film director, was born in Farnborough.
 Composer Percy Fletcher lived in Farnborough during the 1920s, when he was working in London as a theatre composer and conductor.

Media
Only some parts of Farnborough are served by two free local newspapers, The Star Courier (published from 18 September 2008 as a combination of the former Surrey Hants Star and the Aldershot Farnborough Courier) and The Rush, along with one local available for purchase, The Farnborough News & Mail. Although the local ITV news region is ITV Meridian and the local BBC TV news region is BBC South, the area is also served from Crystal Palace and Guildford transmitters carrying London programming. Farnborough is covered by BBC radio on BBC Surrey. Local commercial radio stations are 96.4 Eagle Radio and Eagle Extra as well as Heart Thames Valley.

Commerce

Cody Technology Park
The headquarters of QinetiQ is located in Cody Technology Park.

Farnborough Aerospace Centre (business park)

Farnborough Aerospace Centre is a business park south of the airfield.

IQ Farnborough (business park)

Adjacent to the airport, IQ Farnborough (formerly Farnborough Business Park), is a development.

When completed it will include new housing, a new aviation library and the refurbishing of the listed wind tunnels on the site. Current tenants  include: AgustaWestland, Autodesk, a BMW & MINI dealership, Costco warehouse, Blue Coat Systems, Bluhalo, Defence Strategy & Solutions, Imagine Homes, a hotel, Orcare Limited, Fluor Limited, Red Hat and DGTL.

On the park is the frame of a 1910 Airship Hangar which had previously been dismantled to house wind tunnels, but is now reconstructed – minus its outer skin – to make an impressive centrepiece. The structure has now been listed and protected as a Grade II building.

During the fifteenth series of Top Gear a race was performed around the business park.

In 2013, BMW announced that it will move its UK headquarters from Bracknell to the former Nokia facility on the outskirts of Farnborough.

Other notable companies 
Other notable companies present in Farnborough are Zurich Insurance, Aon Hewitt, BAE Systems, Qualcomm, Lockheed Martin, Holt's Military Banking, Fluor Corporation, and Lok'nStore.

Other industry
Farnborough's North Camp district is notable as being the location of Hampshire's only full-throughput abattoir. The abattoir is nestled between housing and a school, Salesian College. Its site has entrances on both Peabody Road and Sherborne Road. It is licensed to kill bulls, cows, sheep, pigs and goats.

Retail
Farnborough has one main shopping centre divided into two areas; The Meads, comprising the former Kingsmead and Queensmead, and Princes Mead. There are four supermarkets in Farnborough. Towards the south of Farnborough is North Camp village with independent retailers.

Solartron retail park and Horizon retail park are located to the West of the town centre.

On the border with Frimley, there is a retail park known as Blackwater Retail Park (formerly Farnborough Gate).

Education

Primary schools
There are currently seventeen primary schools in Farnborough.

 Cherrywood Community Primary School
 Cove Infant School
 Cove Junior School
 Fernhill Primary School
 Grange Community Junior School
 Guillemont Junior School
 Manor Infant School
 Manor Junior School
 North Farnborough Infant School
 Parsonage Farm Infant School
 Pinewood Infant School
 South Farnborough Infant School
 South Farnborough Junior School
 Southwood Infant School
 St Bernadette's Catholic Primary School
 St Mark's Church of England Aided Primary School
 St Patrick's Catholic Primary School
 St Peter's Church of England Aided Junior School
 Tower Hill Primary School

Secondary schools
There are three state secondary schools in Farnborough. All three are non-selective, mixed comprehensives, for pupils aged 11–16.
 Cove School
 Fernhill School
 The Wavell School

Independent schools
There are two independent Roman Catholic secondary schools in Farnborough. Both are single-sex, selective and include sixth forms.
 Farnborough Hill
 Salesian College

Further education
The town is home to the Sixth Form College, Farnborough, which draws in around 4,000 students aged 16–19 from the surrounding area.

Farnborough College of Technology is a further-education institution specialising in BTEC, A-level and vocational courses for students aged 16+.

Higher education
Whilst there are no universities in Farnborough, University Centre Farnborough (UCF) at Farnborough College of Technology, provides degree-level courses, accredited by the University of Surrey.

Town centre
The centre of Farnborough includes the Kingsmead, Queensmead and Princesmead Shopping precincts. In February 2007, Rushmoor Borough Council unveiled plans to renovate the centre of Farnborough over the next two decades. The town centre study outlines major changes to the council offices, Farnborough's main railway station, the local road network and the continuation of the improvements to Farnborough's town centre, including the development of a Discovery Centre (a Hampshire County Council initiative aimed at improving libraries in the county). Farnborough Town Hall, in Alexandra Road, has been converted for office use and is now known as Ferneberga House.

Following a public consultation during the winter 2011–12, a 'town centre prospectus' outlining extensive redevelopment plans for the whole centre, including the building of a new cinema, a significant expansion of the available retail space, a new look for Queensmead shopping street and a community-led theatre or cultural venue was published.

On the edge of the town centre was the Farnborough Leisure Centre, which had a swimming pool, gym, indoor bowling, squash courts and ten pin bowling. In 2021, the leisure centre was closed to be demolished to make way for a new leisure centre. The plans submitted for redevelopment of the facility are intended be part of a regeneration project for the Farnborough Civic Quarter, which includes Farnborough Library, the Elles Hall community centre, Westmead House and the site of the former police station.

Sport

Football
The football club, Farnborough FC (known as Farnborough Town FC until 2007), play in the Nationwide South. As Farnborough Town FC, the team came to national prominence in 2003 when they reached the fourth round of the FA Cup, where they played the previous season's Cup winners Arsenal at Highbury. They were drawn to play the tie at home but the venue was switched on police advice. The match was won 5–1 by Arsenal.
As Farnborough FC they have won the British Gas Business South and West and Premier division and got to the final of the Hampshire Senior Cup against Basingstoke but lost. The town's other clubs are Cove, Farnborough North End and South Farnborough. These teams play in the Southern Counties League and Aldershot & District League respectively.

Rugby
Established in 1915 (originally as the Royal Aircraft Factory Rugby Union Football Club) Farnborough Rugby Football Club is primarily a rugby union club based at Tile Barn Close in Farnborough. They play in Hampshire Division 1. They also have a Minis and Juniors section which caters for boys from 5 to 19 years of age and girls from 5 to 12 years of age. In the summer 2007 season they also fielded a successful rugby league team, winning the Co-op Southern Conference competition in their first year of entering.

Cricket
One cricket club in Farnborough is Cove Cricket Club. It fields five senior sides on a Saturday including an Academy XI playing in the Morrant Thames Valley Cricket League and one side on a Sunday playing a combination of league and friendly games. In 2007 Cove established a mini's section, providing cricket related fun on a Monday evening for players aged 4 to 7. Cove run boys teams at U9, U11, U13, and U15 and girls teams at U13 and U15.

Hockey
Camberley and Farnborough Hockey Club play men and women's field hockey in nearby Camberley (Kings International College).
The London 2012 Bronze medal and Rio 2016 Gold medal-winning Alex Danson went to school and played hockey at Farnborough Hill. Danson is a former captain of the Great Britain and England Women's Hockey Teams.

Motorsports

The Farnborough District Motor Club holds rallies, autocross, sprint, hillclimbing events throughout the year.

Basketball
Farnborough Phantoms Basketball Club was formed in 1996 and has men's, ladies' and junior teams which play in local leagues.

Twinned towns - sister cities

Rushmoor is twinned with:
 Dayton, Ohio, United States (since 2019)
 Gorkha Municipality, Nepal (since 2020)
 Meudon, France (since 1974)
 Oberursel, Germany (since 1989)
  Rzeszów, Poland (since 2019)
 Sulechów, Poland (since 2001)

Neighbouring areas

Geography and climate
Farnborough forms, with Blackwater and Aldershot, a projection of northeast Hampshire into Surrey. The River Blackwater marks the county boundary. It is directly to the south of junction 4 of the M3 motorway and its Cove/West Heath parts, included its official GSS built-up area is north-west of the town centre; a similar area, North Camp, is immediately south and a smaller area, Southwood, to the west. The town lies at the centre of the Blackwater Valley conurbation, which includes Aldershot, Camberley, Yateley, Sandhurst, Frimley and Farnham.

North Camp is contiguous with the garrison town of Aldershot to the south. Its northern parts abut Frimley to the east and the Hawley part of Blackwater to the north. The council of the local government district of Rushmoor is based in the town, having borough status and including Aldershot.

Farnborough's suburban areas include Southwood, Rafborough, Cove, West Heath, Farnborough Park, Farnborough Street, North Camp, South Farnborough, Fox Lane, Hawley Lane, St. John's, and St. Christopher's.

Within Farnborough the only naturally occurring significant flowing water is Cove Brook.

The Met Office have a weather station at Farnborough Airport which has been operating since 1914.

See also

 Basingstoke Canal
 List of schools in Hampshire
 List of further education colleges in Hampshire

Notes

External links

 Rushmoor Borough Council
 Hantsphere: Hampshire's Heritage in Place

 
Towns in Hampshire
Unparished areas in Hampshire
Rushmoor